Pararotadiscus is an abundant jellyfish-like fossil from the mid-Cambrian, and one of the most abundant taxa in the Kaili biota.

References

Prehistoric deuterostomes